is a railway station on the Hakodate Main Line in Ebetsu, Hokkaidō, Japan, operated by Hokkaido Railway Company (JR Hokkaido). The station is numbered A08.

Lines
Takasago Station is served by the Hakodate Main Line.

Station layout
The station consists of two opposed side platforms serving two tracks. The station has automated ticket machines, automated turnstiles which accept Kitaca, and a "Midori no Madoguchi" staffed ticket office.

Platforms

Adjacent stations

See also
 List of railway stations in Japan

References

Railway stations in Hokkaido Prefecture
Railway stations in Japan opened in 1986